Llagas Creek is a perennial stream in Santa Clara County, California, United States. The headwaters rise on the eastern side of Crystal Peak near Loma Prieta. From there, the creek flows northeast along Casa Loma Road, until it reaches Uvas Road, and then turns south. At Oak Glen Avenue, the creek turns southeast, passing through Chesbro Reservoir, and the cities of Morgan Hill, San Martin, and Gilroy. The creek continues its southward flow, eventually joining with the Pajaro River at the San Benito County line.

The lower Llagas Creek, south of Gilroy, passes through a system of percolation ponds (Lower Miller Slough) which are used to treat wastewater in the area.

See also
 Riparian zone
 List of watercourses in the San Francisco Bay Area

References

External links
 

Rivers of Santa Clara County, California
Santa Cruz Mountains
Rivers of Northern California
Tributaries of the Pajaro River